Tai Kei Leng is a village in Shap Pat Heung, Yuen Long District, Hong Kong.

Features
Several buildings in the village have been listed as Grade III historic buildings: they are the houses at Nos. 26, 27, 45, 112, 119, 173, 186 and 188, Siu Lo at No. 643, as well as the Ji Yeung Study Hall at No. 23 of the village.

Education
Tai Kei Leng is divided between Primary One Admission (POA) School Net 73 and POA School Net 74. Within POA 73 are multiple aided schools (operated independently but funded with government money) and one government school: South Yuen Long Government Primary School (南元朗官立小學). POA 74 has multiple aided schools and one government school: Yuen Long Government Primary School (元朗官立小學).

References

External links

 Delineation of area of existing village Tai Kei Leng (I) (Shap Pat Heung) for election of resident representative (2019 to 2022)
 Delineation of area of existing village Tai Kei Leng (II) (Shap Pat Heung) for election of resident representative (2019 to 2022)
 Antiquities Advisory Board. Historic Building Appraisal. No. 45 Tai Kei Leng, Main Building Pictures
 Antiquities Advisory Board. Historic Building Appraisal. No. 45 Tai Kei Leng, Ancillary Building Pictures
 Antiquities Advisory Board. Historic Building Appraisal. No. 45 Tai Kei Leng, Entrance Gates and Enclosing Wall Pictures
 Antiquities Advisory Board. Historic Building Appraisal. No. 173 Tai Kei Leng Pictures
 Antiquities Advisory Board. Historic Building Appraisal. Siu Lo, No. 643 Tai Kei Leng Pictures
 Antiquities Advisory Board. Historic Building Appraisal. No. 119 Tai Kei Leng Pictures
 Antiquities Advisory Board. Historic Building Appraisal. No. 27 Tai Kei Leng Pictures
 Antiquities Advisory Board. Historic Building Appraisal. No. 26 Tai Kei Leng Pictures
 Antiquities Advisory Board. Historic Building Appraisal. Ji Yeung Study Hall, No. 23 Tai Kei Leng Pictures
 Antiquities Advisory Board. Historic Building Appraisal. No. 112 Tai Kei Leng Pictures
 Antiquities Advisory Board. Historic Building Appraisal. Nos. 186 & 188 Tai Kei Leng Pictures
 Antiquities Advisory Board. Historic Building Appraisal. No. 542 Tai Kei Leng Pictures

Villages in Yuen Long District, Hong Kong
Shap Pat Heung